Batrachosuchus henwoodi is a fossil species of amphibian, first described as Blinasaurus henwoodi by John W. Cosgriff in 1969. The species was placed in a new generic combination when separating the genus Blinasaurus, currently subsumed as a synonym to the genus Platycepsion.

References 

Brachyopids

Triassic temnospondyls of Australia
Fossils of Australia
Fossil taxa described in 1969